Kalle Viljakainen (18 March 1853, Joroinen – 17 April 1913) was a Finnish journalist and politician. He belonged to the Young Finnish Party. He was a Member of the Diet of Finland from 1894 to 1906 and a Member of the Parliament of Finland from 1907 until his death in 1913.

References

1853 births
1913 deaths
People from Joroinen
People from Mikkeli Province (Grand Duchy of Finland)
Young Finnish Party politicians
Members of the Diet of Finland
Members of the Parliament of Finland (1907–08)
Members of the Parliament of Finland (1908–09)
Members of the Parliament of Finland (1909–10)
Members of the Parliament of Finland (1910–11)
Members of the Parliament of Finland (1911–13)
University of Helsinki alumni